George Mario "Jamie" Sahely Chehin Astaphan, M.D., B.Sc. (May 22, 1946 – August 18, 2006) was a physician who became infamous for giving steroids to the sprinter Ben Johnson.

Dr. Astaphan was born on the island of St. Kitts in the West Indies. He attended universities in Canada, where he received a BSc degree from Sir George Williams University (1967) in Montreal, and then graduated from the University of Toronto's Faculty of Medicine in 1971. He practiced medicine in various places in Ontario, Canada: Warkworth, Campbellford, Scarborough, North York, and Toronto.

In 1988 he was accused of administering the stanozolol which led Ben Johnson to lose his 100m Gold Medal.  These allegations were never proven and Dr. Astaphan denied them for the next 18 years. As a result of the Dubin Inquiry, he was fined by the Ontario College of Physicians and Surgeons in June 1991 and banned from practicing medicine in the province for 18 months.

In 1994, after the plane he was flying on was diverted to New York City, he was charged for conspiracy to distribute steroids, conspiracy to acquire cocaine and conspiracy to distribute cocaine. After nearly two years in a Florida prison without a trial, he was released with "time served" on the steroid charges but the Government had no case on the cocaine charges. After his release in late 1995, Astaphan returned to his native St. Kitts and Nevis where he continued to practice medicine until his death.

He died in 2006 of a heart attack at home in St. Kitts. He is survived by his three children.

References

External links
 CBC Interview with Barbara Frum following the Johnson incident
 Astaphan fuelled Ben's run to gold
 Doctor at centre of Ben Johnson steroid scandal dies

1946 births
2006 deaths
People from Saint Kitts
Ben Johnson doping case
Sportspeople from Toronto
Saint Kitts and Nevis emigrants to Canada
Canadian sports physicians
Saint Kitts and Nevis physicians
Sir George Williams University alumni
University of Toronto alumni
20th-century Canadian physicians